L'Espunyola is a municipality located in the southwest of the comarca of Berguedà, Catalonia. Prior to 1983 it was known simply as "Espunyola," without an article. The municipality includes a small exclave to the west.

Sites of interest
Castle of L'Espunyola, from the 13th and 16th centuries.
Church of Sant Climent, built in the 11–12th and 17–18th centuries.

References

External links
 Government data pages 

Municipalities in Berguedà